Les Ballets Nègres was Europe's first black dance company, founded in 1946 by Jamaican dancers Berto Pasuka and Ritchie Riley. The English composer (of Spanish origin) Leonard Salzedo and his wife, the dancer Pat Clover, were closely involved with the group, and Salzedo wrote four scores for them for piano, tom tom and maracas: De Prophet, They Came, Market Day and Aggrey.  Their first performance was at the Twentieth Century Theatre in Westbourne Grove, London, on 30 April 1946. Performances of They Came and Market Day were broadcast by BBC Television on 8 June 1949. A further television broadcast was made on 3 January 1950. The company disbanded in 1953, after several European tours.

On 8 August 1999 a tribute to Les Ballets Nègres was staged at the Royal Festival Hall in London's Southbank Centre.

References

External links
 Newsreel of Les Ballets Nègres in rehearsal for their first performance (British Pathé, 1946)

Dance companies in the United Kingdom
Black British culture